The Edward and Irene Hobbs House, at 487 E. Vine St. in Murray, Utah, was listed on the National Register of Historic Places in 2018.

Edward Hobbs (1888-1978) died at age 89; he was buried in the Murray City Cemetery. Irene McHenry Hobbs (1889–1975) was also buried there.

References

National Register of Historic Places in Salt Lake County, Utah
Buildings and structures in Murray, Utah
Houses on the National Register of Historic Places in Utah